Willie J. Hargrave High School is public high school in the Huffman community of unincorporated Harris County, Texas, United States.

The school opened in 2005, and includes grades 9 through 12, and is a part of the Huffman Independent School District, serving unincorporated sections of Harris County and small sections of Houston.

The old Hargrave High School is currently Huffman Middle School. A new high school was built recently.

Athletics
The Hargrave Falcons compete in the following sports:

Baseball
Basketball
Cross Country
Football
Golf
Powerlifting
Soccer
Softball
Tennis
Track and Field
Volleyball

State Champions
Softball
2015 beat Needville 6-4
2019 beat Anna 12-0

References

External links
 Official site

Public high schools in Harris County, Texas
Public education in Houston
2005 establishments in Texas